This is a recap of the 1984 season for the Professional Bowlers Association (PBA) Tour.  It was the tour's 26th season, and consisted of 34 events. With Earl Anthony now retired, it was the bowler with the second-highest career wins, Mark Roth, who stepped up to take his fourth PBA Player of the Year honor.  Roth won four titles in 1984, upping his career title count to 31 (second to Anthony's 41), and won his first major title at the BPAA U.S. Open. Roth had previously qualified for the TV finals in ten major championships without winning. Adding to his accolades, Roth also became the PBA's second career millionaire (after Anthony) when he took the title at the Greater Detroit Open, and he capped the season by winning the Angle Touring Players Championship.

Bob Chamberlain, a 35-year-old who had toiled on and off the PBA Tour (mostly off) and had recently returned from treatment for alcoholism, won his first ever PBA Tour event at the Toledo Trust PBA National Championship. Meanwhile, Mike Durbin became the first three-time winner in the Firestone Tournament of Champions, having previously won in 1972 and 1982.

Nelson Burton, Jr. broke a 12-year-old record for a four-game TV series when he toppled 1,050 pins en route to the title at the AMF Angle Open.

Tournament schedule

References

External links
1984 Season Schedule

Professional Bowlers Association seasons
1984 in bowling